The 2002 Women's National Invitation Tournament was a single-elimination tournament of 32 NCAA Division I teams that were not selected to participate in the 2002 Women's NCAA tournament. It was the fifth edition of the postseason Women's National Invitation Tournament (WNIT).

The final four of the tournament paired Houston against Virginia Tech and Michigan State against Oregon. Houston upended Virginia Tech, 77–72, while Oregon beat Michigan State, 65–54.

The final pitted Houston and Oregon. In a close game, Oregon pulled out the victory for their first WNIT Championship, 54–52. Oregon had previously won the National Women's Invitational Tournament (NWIT) title in 1989.

Bracket
Visiting teams in first round are listed first. Source

South Regional bracket

East Regional bracket

Midwest Regional bracket

West Regional bracket

Semifinals and championship game

All-tournament team
 Cathrine Kraayeveld, Oregon (MVP)
 Shaquala Williams, Oregon
 Chandi Jones, Houston
 Valerie Muoneke, Houston
 Vnemina Reese, Michigan State
 Ieva Kubliņa, Virginia Tech

Source:

See also
 2002 NCAA Division I men's basketball tournament
 2002 NCAA Division I women's basketball tournament
 2002 National Invitation Tournament

References

Women's National Invitation Tournament
Women's National Invitation Tournament